Janet and Mark were a series of basic reading books from Harper and Row first published in 1966. They were not unlike the early Dick and Jane series. In 1969, California adopted the line of textbooks for use throughout the state for children four to eight years old.

Books
On our Way to Read - used prior to the pre-primer series
Janet and Mark
Outdoors and In 
City Days, City Ways 
 Just for Fun
 Real and Make-Believe
 From Faraway Places

External links
An article from The New York Review of Books 9/3/1970

Series of children's books
Early childhood education
Early childhood education in the United States